The , also known as the  and , is one of the eight extant indigenous horse breeds of Japan, and the only one of the eight not critically endangered. It originated on the island of Hokkaido, in the far north of the country, and is found particularly along the Pacific (eastern) coast of the island. The people of Hokkaido may be nicknamed "Dosanko" after the horses.

History

The Dosanko is thought to derive from horses brought to the island from the Tōhoku region of north-eastern Honshu in the late Tokugawa period (1603–1868), and abandoned there.

Total numbers of the breed grew from 1180 in 1973 to almost 3000 head in the early 1990s, but by the year 2000 had fallen to 1950 horses. A herd book was established in 1979. Hokkaido University receives a grant to study conservation measures for the breed.

References

Japanese culture
Horse breeds originating in Japan
Horse breeds